Steppin' Out is an album by Herb Alpert, released by the record label Shout! Factory
on November 19, 2013. In the United States, the album reached a peak position of number fifteen on Billboard Jazz Albums chart, and earned Alpert a Grammy Award for Best Pop Instrumental Album at the 56th Annual Grammy Awards on January 26, 2014.

Track listing
 "Puttin' On the Ritz"-3:02
 "Jacky's Place"-4:14
 "Our Song"-5:03
 "Green Lemonade"-4:04
 "I Only Have Eyes for You"-3:29
 "Good Morning Mr. Sunshine"-4:01
 "Oblivion"-4:26
 "What'll I Do?"-3:31
 "Côte d'Azur"-4:03
 "La Vie en Rose"-2:42
 "It's All in the Game"-3:18
 "Europa"-4:44
 "And the Angels Sing"-3:07
 "Skylark"-4:34
 "Migration"-3:51
 "The Lonely Bull"-4:39

References

2013 albums
Grammy Award for Best Contemporary Instrumental Album
Herb Alpert albums
Shout! Factory albums